Deantoni Parks (born November 2, 1977) is an American new wave/avant-garde/experimental musician. He is the co-founder, co-producer and drummer of the New York band KUDU along with artist Sylvia Black, and one half of the writing duo We Are Dark Angels alongside Nicci Kasper, also a member of KUDU. Parks was a member of progressive rock band the Mars Volta and (together with Kasper) a member of the alternative rock act Bosnian Rainbows.

Based in Brooklyn, New York, Parks is a vested partner in a developing audio/visual communications agency. In between writing and performances he has been participating as part-time faculty at Stanford Jazz Workshop, Berklee College of Music and NYC's Drummers Collective. He is the founder of Technoself School of Philosophy (2020).

Biography
Deantoni was born and raised in Newnan, Georgia. His family's musical preferences leaned towards funk, Southern soul and gospel and with their full support he began playing drums when he was two years old. He was put in the national spotlight before the age of five as a result of his practice and performance with the Newnan High School band. Xernona Clayton from The Xernona Clayton Show broadcast on WAGA-TV in Atlanta interviewed him for a national broadcast segment that aired in 1982.

He later explored jazz as a teen with Delbert Felix and chose to enroll at Berklee College of Music, where study with Lenny Nelson and exposure to Photek, Squarepusher, and Hidden Agenda turned his focus to the mechanistic beats of electronic music.

KUDU
In 1998, while living in Boston, Deantoni drafted the Now Wave Manifesto. It was these beliefs that provided the foundation for the core song structures that ultimately led to the recording of the KUDU demo. He founded KUDU with his then girlfriend  Sylvia Gordon, Nicci Kasper.

KUDU was performing Photek, Roni Size and Cujo covers at venues (name specific venues or shows with select acts) around Boston. Due to Deantoni's ability to play these hyper/punk/virtuosic rhythms live, KUDU inspired and influenced many American drummers  and live drum and bass acts from 2000 forward. Bill Laswell, Vernon Reid (Living Colour) and Jojo Mayer, were all seen at early KUDU shows after the band relocated to New York City in 2000.

Kudu released their self-titled debut on Velour Recordings, a New York-based label, in 2001. The band eventually agreed to terms with Nublu Records and in 2006 the label released their Death of the Party album. NuBlu also released Back for More: A Remix Collection. The album featured a cherry-picked selection of unreleased tracks, B-sides, rare recordings and remixes by Armand Van Helden, Tommie Sunshine, Sinden, Drop the Lime, King Britt, Curtis Vodka, Hess Is More, LingLing and others.

Between summer 2006 and the fall of 2007 they performed at the Roskilde Festival held south of Roskilde in Denmark, Delta Tejo Festival in Portugal and Transmusicales held annually in Rennes, Brittany, France.

Their last public performance was opening for Me'shell Ndegeocello at the Highline Ballroom in the fall of 2009.

Despite KUDU's early success the group has not released an album since 2008's Back for More. Nicci Kasper, Sylvia Gordon and Deantoni have all continued to write and produce tracks for other artists including John Cale and Me'shell Ndegeocello. In early 2009 Deantoni and Nick Kasper began collaborating as the writing duo, We Are Dark Angels.

Omar Rodriguez-Lopez Group / The Mars Volta / Bosnian Rainbows
Parks briefly joined The Mars Volta in September 2006, following the departure of Blake Fleming. Touring with the band for two months, Parks was subsequently replaced by Thomas Pridgen. Regarding his exit from the band, Parks stated, "I was already working heavily with John Cale at the time, and also KUDU. And, to be honest, at the time, I was just more loyal to them, obviously. And, you know, [The Mars Volta] were looking for drummers too. I was just there to fill-in, or whatever. I mean I clicked really, really well with Omar and I always remember that so I never blocked out the idea of working with them again. It was just that time, it was a weird time for me to join then so that's why it didn't happen."

Deantoni joined the Omar Rodriguez-Lopez Group on their autumn 2010 tour across Japan, the US and Russia. He has also recorded on many of Omar's albums since 2008's release Old Money, for which his contribution had been recorded when Deantoni first joined The Mars Volta in 2006. He rejoined The Mars Volta in late 2010 and stayed until their dissolution after 2012's Noctourniquet.  During this timeframe he was also working on music with TMV members Cedric Bixler-Zavala and Juan Alderete on their respective projects, although all are yet to see release besides Deantoni making appearances on Big Sir records.

Together with Rodriguez-Lopez, singer Teri Gender Bender of Le Butcherettes and his KUDU/Dark Angels bandmate Kasper, Parks formed a new band called Bosnian Rainbows in 2012. Their first full-length, self-titled album was released on June 25, 2013.

Teaching
Deantoni's work as an instructor at Stanford Jazz Workshop, The Drummer's Collective NYC, and Berklee College of Music since '98 led to him founding Technoself School of Philosophy in 2020 operating privately as an online school via Discord.

Discography
Solo Work
 Touch But Don't Look (2012) on Sargent House/Rodriguez-Lopez Productions 
 Technoself (Leaving/Stones Throw; 2015)
 WALLY (2016)
 Deanthoven (2016)
 Look This (2016) as WE ARE DARK ANGELS
 ELEVENELEVEN (2017) 
 Dog Eat Dog (Original Motion Picture Soundtrack) (2017) 
 Homo Deus (Leaving/Stones Throw; 2018)
 Augusta (Humani Machina Records, Alpha Pup Records) 2019
 Westwave (2019)
 Silver Cord (Humani Machina Records, Alpha Pup Records) 2020
Session Recordings
Flying Lotus - You're Dead! (2014)
Flying Lotus - Flamagra (2019)

Collaborations
 Last Night – Moby (2008) – contribution to an LP
 The Biggest Piano In Town - Grand Pianoramax on ObliqSound (2008), Leo Tardin - keyboards, Deantoni Parks - drums, Adam Deitch - drums, Mike Ladd - vocals, Celena Glenn - vocals, Invincible - vocals, Spleen - vocals

With Astroid Power-Up!
 Google Plex (2003) - LP

With Gray
 1979 (Unreleased) - LP
 Shades of... - (2019)

With KUDU
 Kudu (2001) - LP
 Death of the Party (2006) - LP
 Back for More: A Remix Collection (2008) - LP

With John Cale
 Circus Live (2007)
 Extra Playful (2011)
 Shifty Adventures in Nookie Wood (2012)
 MFANS (2016)
 Mercy (2023)

With Meshell Ndegeocello
 The Article 3 (2006)
 The World Has Made Me the Man of My Dreams (2007)
 Devil's Halo (2009)
 Weather (2011)
 Pour une Âme Souveraine: A Dedication to Nina Simone (2012)

With Omar Rodríguez-López
Old Money (2008)
Solar Gambling (2009)
Dōitashimashite (2010) - Omar Rodriguez Lopez Group live release
Un Escorpión Perfumado (2010)
Noctourniquet (2012) - The Mars Volta's 6th LP
Saber, Querer, Osar y Callar (2012)
Bosnian Rainbows Live At Clouds Hill (2012)
Unicorn Skeleton Mask (2013)
¿Sólo Extraño? (2013)
Bosnian Rainbows (2013) - self-titled debut
A Raw Youth (2015) - Le Butcherettes's 3rd LP
Sworn Virgins (2016)
Blind Worms Pious Swine (2016)
El Bien Y Mal Nos Une (2016)
Cell Phone Bikini (2016)
Zapopan (2016)
Nom de Guerre Cabal (2016)
Some Need It Lonely (2016)
A Lovejoy (2016)
Roman Lips (2017)
Zen Thrills (2017)
Chocolate Tumor Hormone Parade (2017) - Omar Rodriguez Lopez Group live release
Azul, Mis Dientes (2017)
Gorilla Preacher Cartel (2017)
Killing Tingled Lifting Retreats (2017)
Solid State Mercenaries (2017)
Doom Patrol (2017)
TBA - Bosnian Rainbows' 2nd LP

With Juan Alderete
Before Gardens After Gardens (2012) - Big Sir's 3rd LP
Digital Gardens (2014) - Big Sir's 4th LP
TBA - Vato Negro's 2nd LP

Filmography
Feature films

Deantoni is composer as WE ARE DARK ANGELS alongside Nicci Kasper on Dog Eat Dog (2016). Dog Eat Dog is directed by Paul Schrader (Taxi Driver, Mishima) and stars Nicolas Cage and Willem Dafoe. Based on the Edward Bunker novel of the same name. Deantoni Parks & Nicci Kasper as WE ARE DARK ANGELS scored the last scene of Director Paul Schrader's First Reformed. Lustmord Aka Brian Williams scored the rest of the film.

Deantoni was featured as an actor and drummer in Mark Ruffalo's directorial debut Sympathy for Delicious along with Juliette Lewis, Laura Linney, Orlando Bloom and Mark Ruffalo. He also performed on the title track for the movie with The Mars Volta's Cedric Bixler and Omar Rodriguez-Lopez. Deantoni appeared on the soundtrack of the Tamra Davis documentary, The Radiant Child, with Michael Holman and Jean-Michel Basquiat band, Gray.

Short films

While touring the globe between 1998-2009, Deantoni collected hours and hours of video footage. In 2009, he compiled this footage and edited it with photographs from these travels to create a series of ten videos. These ten videos encompass the whole of the DaDa YaYa video series. These short films, all of which are three to ten minutes in length will be produced as Sound Art/Installation/Performance Art pieces. The entire series consists of ten installations (one for each film) and a retrospective, where all of the films will be screened in their entirety. The event series will be produced and marketed by his audio/visual communications agency.

Music videos

 Playing House  (2005) for KUDU
 Bar Star kudu - bar star (2006) for KUDU
 Boom Boom Kudu Boom Boom (2006) for KUDU

Collaborations

 In 2007, Deantoni played drums for a WORLD'S END music video titled "Sialagogue"  featuring Japanese super model Rila Fukushima, directed by Bruno Levy, a New York-based artist known for his video scratching. Bruno, considered a pioneer in the VJ space, and his current project partner, Blake Shaw, have formed SWEATSHOPPE, together with Deantoni they are developing large-scale event proposals that will be marketed by his audio/visual communications agency under the WORLD'S END event series.
 Deantoni co-wrote the music for the song "Party In My Pants" with Doron Braunshtein A/K/A Apollo Braun. The song appears in the 2008's film Religulous, directed by Larry Charles.
 Played drums for two songs on the 2017 album Drunk, by Thundercat. "Jethro" & "Where I'm Going"

Band history
Astroid Power-up!
Kudu
The Mars Volta
Omar Rodríguez-López
Bosnian Rainbows
John Cale
Meshell Ndegeocello
Moby
Lenny Kravitz
Alice Smith
Cody Chesnutt
Gray --Basquiat's Industrial Noise Band--*
Sade
Marc Ribot
Vato Negro
We Are Dark Angels (With Nicci Kasper)
World's End

References

External links
Solo Myspace
Astroid Power-up! Myspace
Kudu Myspace
WORLD'S END "Sialagogue" music video
April 2010 Modern Drummer Interview
April 2010 Times Herald Interview
 SIGHT/SOUND/RHYTHM interview 2012

1977 births
Living people
African-American drummers
African-American rock musicians
American new wave musicians
American avant-garde musicians
American rock drummers
Alternative rock drummers
American experimental musicians
African-American male actors
American male actors
African-American film directors
African-American record producers
People from Newnan, Georgia
Musicians from Georgia (U.S. state)
Record producers from Georgia (U.S. state)
Berklee College of Music alumni
The Mars Volta members
20th-century American drummers
American male drummers
Film directors from Georgia (U.S. state)
21st-century American drummers
20th-century American male musicians
21st-century American male musicians
Bosnian Rainbows members
20th-century African-American musicians
21st-century African-American musicians